The FL7 (until 2012 FR7) is a regional rail route.  It forms part of the network of the Lazio regional railways, which is operated by Trenitalia, and converges on the city of Rome, Italy.

The route operates over the infrastructure of the Rome–Formia–Naples railway.  Within the territory of the comune of Rome, it plays the role of a commuter railway. It is estimated that on average about 40,000 passengers travel on an FR7 train each day.

The designation FL7 appears only in publicity material (e.g. public transport maps), in the official timetables, and on signs at some stations.  The electronic destination boards at stations on the FL7 route show only the designation "R" and the relevant train number.

Route 

  Roma Termini ↔ Minturno-Scauri

The FL7, a radial route, runs from Roma Termini, on the southern perimeter of Rome's city centre, in a south easterly direction, via the Rome–Formia–Naples railway, to Formia-Gaeta and Minturno-Scauri.

History
When the FL7 was introduced in 1994, it was divided at Campoleone into two branches. One ran to Nettuno, and the other to Formia (which was renamed Formia-Gaeta in 2012).
 
Since the introduction of the FL7, the Roma–Nettuno services have been reclassified as a separate line, the FL8.

Stations 
The stations on the FL7 are as follows:
 Roma Termini        
 Torricola 
 Pomezia-Santa Palomba 
 Campoleone 
 Cisterna di Latina
 Latina
 Sezze Romano
 Priverno-Fossanova
 Monte San Biagio
 Fondi-Sperlonga
 Itri
 Formia-Gaeta
 Minturno-Scauri

Scheduling 
The FL7 route is included in the Trenitalia official timetable M85 Roma–Napoli.

, services operated at regular intervals, with extra services at rush hour. However, some services skip some stops (at Torricola, Pomezia-Santa Palomba and Itri). Many services do not terminate/originate at Formia-Gaeta but at other stations, such as Minturno-Scauri, Sessa Aurunca, or Naples.

See also 

 History of rail transport in Italy
 List of railway stations in Lazio
 Rail transport in Italy
 Transport in Rome

References

External links
 ATAC – official site 
 ATAC map – schematic depicting all routes in the Rome railway network

This article is based upon a translation of the Italian language version as at November 2012.

Ferrovie regionali del Lazio